St Mary's Park is a cricket ground and former football ground in Saint Kitts and Nevis.

History
Located at Cayon on the island of Saint Kitts, the ground has played host to the Leeward Islands cricket team for two major cricket matches in January 2007. The first of these was a first-class match against Jamaica in the 2006–07 Carib Beer Cup. The match ended in a draw, with notable contributions from Sylvester Joseph (97) and Omari Banks (100) for the Leeward Islands, and Wavell Hinds (100) for Jamaica. Following the conclusion of this match, the two sides played a List A one-day match in the KFC Cup. Jamaica won the match by 5 wickets, despite a century from Sylvester Joseph. The ground later played host to three Women's Twenty20 Internationals between West Indies women and Sri Lanka women.

The ground was previously the home of Cayon Rockets football club, who play in the SKNFA Premier League.

See also
List of cricket grounds in the West Indies

References

External links
St Mary's Park at ESPNcricinfo

Cricket grounds in Saint Kitts and Nevis
Sports venues in Saint Kitts and Nevis